Francesco Mattei (born 19 September 1973) is an Italian rower. He competed in the men's eight event at the 1996 Summer Olympics.

References

External links
 

1973 births
Living people
Italian male rowers
Olympic rowers of Italy
Rowers at the 1996 Summer Olympics
Sportspeople from Como